Alexandre-Antoine Hureau de Sénarmont (21 April 176926 October 1810) was a French artillery general.

He was born in Strasbourg and educated at the Metz school for engineer and artillery cadets. In 1785, he was commissioned in the artillery, in which he served as a regimental officer for fifteen years. In 1800, he won great credit both by his exertions in bringing the artillery of the Army of Reserve over the Alps and by his handling of guns in the Battle of Marengo. In 1806, as a brigadier general and commander of the artillery of an army corps, he took part in the Jena and Eylau.

But he is remembered chiefly for the case shot attack, which was the central feature of Napoleon's matured tactical system and which Sénarmont put into execution for the first time at the Battle of Friedland. For this feat, he was made a baron, and in 1808, he was promoted to divisional general by Napoleon on the field of battle in front of Madrid. He was killed at the Siege of Cadiz in October 1810.

In 1811, an urn with his heart was interred in the Panthéon, Paris.

References

External links
 French Artillery of the Napoleonic Wars

French military personnel of the French Revolutionary Wars
French commanders of the Napoleonic Wars
1769 births
1810 deaths
French military personnel killed in the Napoleonic Wars
Names inscribed under the Arc de Triomphe